The Hisar Police Lines Golf Course, is in Hisar, in the Hisar district of Haryana State, India.

Description
The course is located on Hisar-Barwala road next to Hisar Airport, parallel to the future runway extension. It is close to Blue Bird Lake, Deer Park, Hisar, and Shatavar Vatika Herbal Park, Hisar. It was set up by the Haryana Police, which is a department of Government of Haryana.

References

Hisar (city)
Golf clubs and courses in India
Sports venues in Haryana
Year of establishment missing